Archdiocese of Corinth may refer to the following ecclesiastical jurisdictions :

 the former residential (crusader) and present titular Catholic Latin Archbishopric of Corinth
 the present Greek Orthodox Metropolis of Corinth, Sicyon, Zemenon, Tarsos and Polyphengos